The Schleicher ASK 23 is a single-seat Club Class sailplane that was built by the German manufacturer Alexander Schleicher GmbH & Co.

Design
The ASK 23 was the last glider to be designed by Rudolf Kaiser. It is an early-solo sailplane with docile handling, and was a successor to the Schleicher Ka 8 and ASK 18. It is also the single-seat counterpart of the two-seat Schleicher ASK 21 with a similar cockpit layout. It uses glass-fibre reinforced plastic and 'honeycomb' as its main construction materials. It has no flaps, a nose wheel and a fixed main-wheel with a tail-skid or optional tail-wheel.

Specifications (ASK23)

See also

References

Further reading

External links

Sailplane directory

1980s German sailplanes
Schleicher aircraft
Aircraft first flown in 1983
Shoulder-wing aircraft
T-tail aircraft